Silvana*HDC is a Dutch Warmblood show jumping mare. She was foaled in 1999 and was sired by Corland out of Donate. Voted best mare in the world in 2010, she is ridden by the French horse rider Kevin Staut. She was previously ridden by Kristof Cleeren (2007) and Jos Lansink (2008-2009).

Pedigree

References 

Show jumping horses
1999 animal births
Individual mares